"Round and 'Round (Merry Go 'Round of Love)" is a song by American R&B group Guy recorded for their self-titled debut album Guy (1988). The song was released as the album's debut single in 1988. The bassline interpolates Michael Jackson's Thriller.

Track listing
12", Vinyl
Round and 'Round (Merry Go 'Round of Love)" (12" Version) - 7:52
Round and 'Round (Merry Go 'Round of Love)" (Acapella) - 4:14
Round and 'Round (Merry Go 'Round of Love)" (Radio Edit) - 5:43
Round and 'Round (Merry Go 'Round of Love)" (Dub Version) - 8:43
Round and 'Round (Merry Go 'Round of Love)" (House Mix) - 7:48
Round and 'Round (Merry Go 'Round of Love)" (Bonus Beats) - 1:49

Chart performance

Notes

External links

1988 singles
Guy (band) songs
Song recordings produced by Teddy Riley
1988 songs
Uptown Records singles
Songs written by Teddy Riley
Songs written by Aaron Hall (singer)